Polish Dragon Boat Racing, also referred to as "tug of oars"  or "dragon war", is a sport consisting of two opposing teams of six rowers attempting to row a dragon boat across a center line, and is similar to tug-of-war. The sport gained popularity in Poland in 2015 after a competition on March 21 of that year at the National Dragon Boat Competition in Olsztyn, and also received some media attention in the United States. A popular video of the March 21st match was uploaded to YouTube on March 25, 2015, by YouTuber SmokiPolnocy, and has been viewed over 58,000 times as of August 2017. There is currently no governing body or league for the sport.

See also
 Dragon boat
 Tug of war

References

Dragon boat racing
Tug of war
Rowing in Poland